The following is an episode list of the Australian situation comedy Mother and Son which originally aired on ABC TV from 16 January 1984 until 21 March 1994.

The first DVD release for home use in Australia was in 2003 with a "best of" selection of nine stories titled "Mother & Son". Four more DVDs were released in succeeding years until every episode had been published, albeit in no clear sequence.

Mother and Son: The Complete Series 1–6 (6 Disc Box Set) was released on 7 November 2007.

Series overview

Season 1: 1984

Season 2: 1985

Season 3: 1985–1986

Season 4: 1988

Season 5: 1992

Season 6: 1994

Mother & Son DVD series
A collection of nine episodes, titled "Mother & Son" was released on DVD by Roadshow Entertainment in 2004 and distributed by ABC Merchandising. Although touted on the box as "stories from Series 1" they were all from Series 2 and 3.
Another four DVDs with titles "Mother & Son Volume 2" to "Mother & Son Volume 5" were released by the same organizations between 2004 and 2007. It may be observed that the three-part story that began with "The Trip" and ended with "The Caravan" was published out of sequence in Volumes 2 and 3. Volume 5 comprised the remaining six stories, most from Season 1.

References

External links

 at australiantelevision.net

Mother and Son